Halford is a surname. Notable people with the surname include:

Alison Halford (born 1940), Welsh former senior police officer and politician
Bruce Halford (1931–2001), British racing driver
Frank Halford (1894–1955), English aircraft engine designer
Frederic M. Halford (1884-1914), British angling author
George Halford (bishop) (1865–1948), Bishop of Rockhampton, England
George Britton Halford (1824–1910), founder of the first medical school in Australia
Greg Halford (born 1984), English footballer
Henry Halford, 1st Baronet (1766–1844), physician to several English monarchs
Johnny Halford (1930–2013), American racing driver
Paul Halford, New Zealand soccer player
Rob Halford (born 1951), Judas Priest vocalist
William Halford (1841–1919), US Navy sailor awarded the Medal of Honor